Bayonne Bridge is an arch bridge spanning the Kill Van Kull and connecting Bayonne, New Jersey with Staten Island in New York City. It carries New York State Route 440 (NY 440) and New Jersey Route 440. It is the sixth-longest steel arch bridge in the world, and it was the longest in the world at the time of its completion. The bridge is also one of four connecting New Jersey with Staten Island; the other two roadway bridges are the Goethals Bridge in Elizabeth and Outerbridge Crossing (which also carries Route 440) in Perth Amboy, and the rail-only span is the Arthur Kill Vertical Lift Bridge, all of which cross the Arthur Kill.

The original  roadway carried two lanes of motor traffic in each direction, as well as a walkway. Completed in 1931, the Bayonne Bridge was built by the Port Authority of New York and New Jersey, which still operates the bridge. It was designed by Swiss master bridge-builder Othmar Ammann and architect Cass Gilbert.

A project to provide increased clearance required to accommodate New Panamax ships began in 2013, and was completed in two stages between 2017 and 2019. The new roadways each carry two lanes of unidirectional motor traffic plus shoulders for disabled vehicles in addition to a separate path for pedestrians and bicyclists, which opened on May 24, 2019. The desired navigational clearance was achieved June 8, 2017.

Design 
Bayonne Bridge was designed by Swiss master bridge-builder Othmar Ammann and architect Cass Gilbert. It spans the Kill Van Kull between Port Richmond in Staten Island, New York, and Bayonne in Hudson County, New Jersey. The bridge was constructed at a 58-degree angle to the Kill Van Kull, parallel to the street networks of both Bayonne and Port Richmond, Staten Island, requiring a longer span than if the bridge had been built perpendicular to the Kill Van Kull.

Roadbed 
The main span was connected to viaducts at either end.

A new roadway was constructed above the existing roadway within the current arch structure. This new clearance was to accommodate Post-Panamax ships.

Arch 
The Bayonne Bridge's arch resembles a parabola, but is made up of 40 linear segments. The design of the steel arch is influenced by the Hell Gate Bridge, also in New York City, designed by Ammann's mentor Gustav Lindenthal. Gilbert had designed an ornamental granite sheathing over the steelwork as part of the original proposal, but as in the case of the George Washington Bridge, the stone sheathing was eliminated in order to lower the cost of the bridge due to material shortages during the Great Depression, leaving the steel trusses exposed on both bridges. It was the first bridge to employ manganese steel for the main arch ribs and rivets.

When completed in 1931, the Bayonne Bridge was the longest through arch bridge in the world. The Bayonne Bridge has a lightweight design, weighing only , compared to the Sydney Harbour Bridge's . The Bayonne Bridge is also half as wide and  shorter than its sister bridge.

History

Planning and construction

In 1921, the Port of New York Authority (now the Port Authority of New York and New Jersey) was created to oversee transportation in the Port of New York and New Jersey. At the time, bridges in New York City were being built at a brisk pace. The Port Authority opened its first two bridges between New Jersey and Staten Island in 1928: the Goethals Bridge and the Outerbridge Crossing. A third crossing was being planned between Port Richmond and Bayonne. All three bridges were built to complement the traffic from a future fourth bridge or a tunnel from Staten Island to Brooklyn. Initially, the third crossing was proposed to be a tunnel. However, the Port Authority ultimately decided to construct a bridge, to be designed by Ammann and Gilbert. Ammann, who was chief architect of the Port Authority, chose the steel arch design after rejecting a cantilever and suspension design as expensive and impractical for the site, given a requirement by the Port Authority that the bridge must be able to accommodate the future addition of rapid transit tracks.

Construction on the bridge began in 1928. At the time, it was supposed to be open in early 1932 and was supposed to cost $16 million, but it ended up costing only $13 million to build. The bridge had to be built without blocking shipping traffic on the Kill Van Kull. To do this, engineers used hydraulic jacks to support the two sides of the arch while the two pieces, consisting of prefabricated truss segments that were made up of high-strength alloy steel, were being built toward a point in a middle. Afterward, prefabricated pieces of the roadway's support structure were hung from cables connected to the arch.

Operation 

The Bayonne Bridge opened on November 15, 1931, after dedication ceremonies were held the previous day. On opening day, about 7,000 pedestrians and 17,000 vehicles crossed the bridge. The new crossing was expected to reduce Staten Islanders' average commutes by an average of 18 to 20 minutes, reducing the need to use the Goethals Bridge or Outerbridge Crossing. The Bayonne Bridge's dedication ceremony was attended by David M. Dow, the Secretary for Australia in the United States, and the same pair of golden shears used to cut the ribbon was sent to Australia for the ribbon-cutting of the Sydney Harbour Bridge four months later. After the ceremony in Sydney, the scissor blades were separated and one was sent back to the Port Authority. Time referred to the symmetric detail of the bridge as "impressive and haunting," while the commune of Bayonne in France sent a congratulatory telegram. The American Institute for Steel Construction selected the Bayonne Bridge as the "Most Beautiful Steel Bridge" in 1931, choosing it over the George Washington Bridge for that status.

Between 1939 and 1942, during World War II, the space under the Bayonne Bridge's Staten Island approach became the Archer Daniels Midland Manhattan Project Storage Site, utilized for storing uranium. The material was used in the nuclear weapons developed during the Manhattan Project, and about 2,007 barrels weighing  were stored under the bridge. Due to the long half-life and high radioactivity of unrefined uranium ore, the site became highly polluted and was later designated a federal Superfund site.

In 1951, twenty years after the bridge opened, the New Jersey tollbooth was re-landscaped by the Port Authority and the City of Bayonne, and in 1956, some land under the New Jersey approach viaduct was set aside to create the Juliette Street Playground. The Bergen Point Ferry, which paralleled the bridge, stayed in service until 1961. A new toll plaza in Staten Island was created in 1964 and made into one-way operation in 1970, with tolls only being collected for vehicles entering the island. The bridge became a National Historic Civil Engineering Landmark in 1985.

Roadbed-raising project

In the 2000s, the Port Authority started planning on a project to allow larger container ships to use the Kill Van Kull. The expansion of the Panama Canal allowed large ships coming from Asia to reach the East Coast, but the bridge was too low for these larger ships to pass under it on the way to and from Newark Bay.

New, larger New Panamax ships made things worse.  If the problem were not fixed, the Port of New York and New Jersey could have lost significant shipping business to other ports such as Charleston, South Carolina.  In August 2009, the Port Authority started a planning analysis to determine how to fix the air draft problem. Final construction in the raise the road project was completed in May 2019 with the opening of the new higher pedestrian and bicycle path.

Specifications
The Port Authority commissioned the U.S. Army Corps of Engineers (CoE) to conduct a study of the question, which was completed in 2009, and authorized up to $10 million for planning and engineering services to develop options to deal with the bridge's low clearance. The CoE study looked at three options for the bridge, besides the no-build option. The quickest option they identified, and the one ultimately chosen, was a $1.7 billion project to raise the bridge's roadway to increase its height by 40 percent, which could be accomplished by 2019 at the earliest. Another option presented was to build a new cable-stayed bridge, which would have cost $2.15 billion and taken until 2022. The most expensive option would be to get rid of the bridge altogether and replace it with either a bored tunnel or an immersed tunnel through which traffic would traverse under the Kill Van Kull. This option would have taken the longest, being complete in 2024 and costing $2.2 to $3 billion. In initial planning documents, a vertical-lift bridge was also considered, but this was not investigated further in the CoE study.

Another study, an environmental review by the U.S. Coast Guard, was commissioned in 2009. The review was required because the project would take place over a navigable waterway. The study cost over $2 million, took four years, and resulted in 5,000 pages of reviews. Despite its duration and cost, which precluded the start of construction until 2013, it was one of the Coast Guard's quickest environmental reviews for such a major project. In March 2012, the Port Authority submitted a request to the federal government for an expedited environmental review process, which was approved in July 2012 even though some residents in Newark and Staten Island said they wanted the Coast Guard to conduct a full environmental review.

	

According to the Port Authority, the "Raise the Roadway" project will have many benefits, the first being that it would allow larger, more environmentally friendly ships to pass through the port. As a result of the project, the proportion of the arc above the roadway would be reduced, with only 22 cables suspending the new roadway below the arch as opposed to 30 cables holding up the old roadway. As for the roadway itself, the single roadway would be replaced by two new roadway decks with new supporting piers and approach roads. Route 440 would be widened from one  roadway with no shoulders and four  lanes, to two  roadways with two  lanes each, a median divider, and  shoulders. There would also be a bikeway and walkway the entire length of the bridge, with access ramps to replace stairs. The design also allows for future transit service such as light rail. Extending the Hudson-Bergen Light Rail line to Staten Island over the bridge has been proposed, though final design plans do not include a rapid transit component. Finally, the project would support nearly 2,800 jobs and $240–380 million in wages throughout the construction industry, as well as $1.6 billion of economic activity.

The CoE estimated that raising the Bayonne Bridge would produce a $3.3 billion national benefit, noting that 12% of all US international containers pass under the bridge, that the port indirectly creates 269,900 jobs, and that port activity generates $11 billion in annual national wages. The project would allow 12,000-container ships to pass under the bridge, increasing capacity; before the project, the largest ships allowed to pass under the bridge were 9,000-container ships. Congressmen from both New York and New Jersey pressed the Port Authority to act quickly, despite lowered revenues from reduced traffic at the Port Authority's six crossings. The Port Authority announced its official plan in 2011.  The Coast Guard held two public meetings about the bridge in 2012. Improvements at Port Jersey on the Upper New York Bay were also underway.

Construction

The Port Authority believed that it was possible to build the new roadway without interrupting traffic flow between Staten Island and Bayonne. In July 2012, the Port Authority announced construction would begin in the middle of 2013, to be completed by 2017. In this timeline, removal of the existing roadway would be completed by late 2015, in time for the opening of the widened Panama Canal. The project would cost $1.7 billion and last five years.

In 2014, Staten Islanders living near the Port Richmond work site filed a lawsuit, alleging that the construction work violated the Civil Rights Act of 1964 by exposing predominately-minority communities in Port Richmond to toxins. In 2015, some Bayonne residents lodged complaints due to excessive noise, vibrations, dust over their neighborhood, and construction debris falling off the bridge (such as paint chips), though the Port Authority later settled those complaints. The project would also necessitate the temporary closure of a park in Bayonne. Additionally, the Bayonne Bridge would remain open to vehicle traffic throughout the construction.

On April 24, 2013, the Port Authority's Board of Commissioners awarded a $743.3 million contract to a joint venture of Skanska Koch and Kiewit Infrastructure Company. The construction involved building support columns first, then adding prefabricated road segments using a gantry crane that rolled on top of the arch. The gantry crane would construct one rope-supported section of the new roadway at a time, using a temporary beam to support the existing roadway while each rope was replaced. The existing roadway would then be removed. Temporary bridge closures allowed new floor beams to be attached to the arch's ropes in order to support steel stringers that would hold up the new roadway. This work was expedited by Barack Obama's presidential administration due to the importance of the project to national commerce, being one of the first applicants to Obama's "We Can't Wait" initiative of important infrastructure projects. New Jersey Governor Chris Christie also considered the project a high priority for his state.

The pedestrian walkway, cantilevered from the western side of the roadway, was temporarily closed on August 5, 2013, for reconstruction. It was to be moved to the eastern side of the bridge.  The walkway was scheduled to reopen in 2017. In 2015, the completion date was delayed to 2019, due to unfavorable weather conditions in the winter of 2014–2015. This also delayed the desired navigational clearance to late 2017. The delays in the project meant that, with the expansion of the Panama Canal being completed in mid-2016, larger ships would not be able to serve Newark, thus possibly negatively affecting traffic to other ports on the United States' East Coast. The Port Authority revised its timeline, expecting traffic to be shifted to the new roadway in early 2017, the old roadway to be removed by late 2017, and the project to be completed in mid-2019 with the completion of the roadway for southbound traffic. In November 2016, the future northbound span, intended temporarily for both directions of travel, was completed.

On February 20, 2017, the completed eastern (future northbound) roadway opened for traffic, with one lane in each direction, and the old lower roadway was permanently closed. The western (future southbound) roadway was scheduled to be completed in 2019, at which time there would be two lanes in each direction and a pedestrian walkway. Also on February 20, the Bayonne Bridge became the first Port Authority crossing to use a fully automated and cashless electronic toll collection system. All vehicles proceed without stopping at the toll plaza. Those with E-ZPass are billed in the usual way, while cameras record the license plate numbers of those without an E-ZPass tag and their registered owners soon receive a toll bill by mail. The desired navigational clearance was achieved June 8, 2017. Two years after the opening of the northbound roadway, on February 11, 2019, the new southbound roadway was completed, and the traffic flow of the bridge was restored to two lanes in each direction. The pedestrian and bike path opened May 24, 2019. The overall project received the 2020 Outstanding Civil Engineering Achievement award from the American Society of Civil Engineers, citing the "first-of-its-kind construction sequence, ... keeping both road and sea traffic open."

Traffic

From January to November 2016, the Bayonne Bridge carried about 4,500 vehicles per day. The E-ZPass automatic collection system was used by 91% of drivers for toll payment.  In 2011, it carried an average of 19,378 vehicles per day, which dropped to a daily average of 15,221 vehicles in 2014 after construction started, and further to 10,840 in 2015. The Bayonne Bridge is more lightly trafficked than any other Port Authority crossing.

In September 2007, MTA Regional Bus Operations began a limited-stop bus route (the S89) that crosses the bridge. The route's termini are the Hylan Boulevard bus terminal in Eltingville, Staten Island and the 34th Street Hudson-Bergen Light Rail Station in Bayonne. This is the first interstate bus service offered by the MTA.

Tolls
, the tolls-by-mail rate going from New Jersey to New York are $17 for cars and motorcycles; there is no toll for passenger vehicles going from New York to New Jersey. New Jersey and New York–issued E-ZPass users are charged $12.75 for cars and $11.75 for motorcycles during off-peak hours, and $14.75 for cars and $13.75 for motorcycles during peak hours. Users with E-ZPass issued from agencies outside of New Jersey and New York are charged the tolls-by-mail rate.

Tolls are collected only for southbound traffic. Originally, tolls were collected in both directions. In August 1970, the toll was abolished for northbound drivers, and at the same time, southbound drivers saw their tolls doubled. The tolls of eleven other New York–New Jersey and Hudson River crossings along a  stretch, from the Outerbridge Crossing in the south to the Rip Van Winkle Bridge in the north, were changed to eastbound-only at that time.

Open-road cashless tolling began on February 20, 2017. The tollbooths were dismantled, and drivers were no longer able to pay cash at the bridge. Instead, there are cameras mounted onto new overhead gantries located on the Staten Island side. A vehicle without E-ZPass has a picture taken of its license plate and a bill for the toll is mailed to its owner. For E-ZPass users, sensors detect their transponders wirelessly.

In popular culture
The Bayonne Bridge appears in the 2005 science fiction film War of the Worlds, being shown in the background several times in the scenes set in the lead character's Bayonne home; it is destroyed in an attack by aliens. The bridge and surrounding Bayonne community was also featured in the 2001 film A Beautiful Mind and the HBO prison drama Oz.

See also
List of bridges documented by the Historic American Engineering Record in New Jersey
List of bridges documented by the Historic American Engineering Record in New York
List of bridges, tunnels, and cuts in Hudson County, New Jersey

References

Notes

Further reading

External links

 Port Authority of New York and New Jersey: Bayonne Bridge
Port Authority of New York and New Jersey: Bayonne Bridge 80th year commemoration
Bayonne Bridge at Bridges & Tunnels
Bayonne Bridge (NY 440 and NJ 440) at NYCRoads.com

Bayonne Bridge Blog

Timeline for the $1.7 billion Bayonne Bridge ‘Raise the Roadway’ project at The Jersey Journal

Bridges completed in 1931
Port Authority of New York and New Jersey
Bridges in Staten Island
Transportation in Bayonne, New Jersey
Through arch bridges in the United States
Toll bridges in New Jersey
Toll bridges in New York City
Historic Civil Engineering Landmarks
Historic American Engineering Record in New Jersey
Historic American Engineering Record in New York City
Bridges in Hudson County, New Jersey
Road bridges in New York City
Road bridges in New Jersey
Bridges by Othmar Ammann
Cass Gilbert buildings
Transportation projects in New York City
Steel bridges in the United States
1931 establishments in New Jersey
1931 establishments in New York (state)
Interstate vehicle bridges in the United States
1931 establishments in New York City